Julian Wyatt Glover  (born 27 March 1935) is an English classical actor with many stage, television, and film roles since commencing his career in the 1950s. He is a recipient of the Laurence Olivier Award and has performed many times for the Royal Shakespeare Company.

Glover's well-known film roles have included being a high profile villain in almost every major motion picture franchise: General Maximilian Veers in The Empire Strikes Back (1980), Aristotle Kristatos in For Your Eyes Only (1981), Brian Harcourt-Smith in The Fourth Protocol (1987) and Walter Donovan in Indiana Jones and the Last Crusade (1989). He also voiced the giant Acromantula spider Aragog in Harry Potter and the Chamber of Secrets (2002) and appeared as conductor Andris Davis in the psychological drama Tár (2022).

Glover has also appeared frequently on television, especially in Britain, including guest appearances in cult series such as The Avengers, The Saint, Thriller, Doctor Who, Blake's 7, Remington Steele and Inside No. 9. He played the recurring supporting role of Grand Maester Pycelle in HBO's Game of Thrones (2011–2016) and appeared as General Beauvilliers in the BBC drama Spies of Warsaw (2013).

Early life 
Glover was born in Hampstead, London, the son of Honor Ellen Morgan (née Wyatt), a BBC journalist, and Claude Gordon Glover, a BBC radio producer. Glover and Wyatt divorced in the 1940s, after the birth of a daughter, Prue, and Honor Wyatt subsequently married George Ellidge. Julian Glover's younger half-brother is the musician Robert Wyatt.

Glover attended Bristol Grammar School, where he was in the same class as future actors Timothy West and David Prowse. He also attended Alleyn's School in Dulwich, London. He graduated from the Royal Academy of Dramatic Art in 1954. He also performed national service in the British Army, where he went on the officers' training course.

Career 
In the early 1950s, Glover appeared in several shows at Unity Theatre, London, and played Tolen in Ann Jellicoe's The Knack at the Royal Court Theatre in 1962. He also performed at the Royal Shakespeare Company. He became a regular actor in 1960s and 1970s British television series such as The Avengers, The Saint, Strange Report, Doctor Who and Blake's 7.

In 1966, Glover played William the Conqueror in A Choice of Kings, then in 1967 featured as Professor Quatermass's nemesis Colonel Breen in the Hammer Films production of Quatermass and the Pit, an adaptation of Nigel Kneale's 1958–1959 BBC TV original. He has also appeared twice in Doctor Who: as Richard the Lionheart in The Crusade (1965); and as the villain Scaroth, last of the Jagaroth, in one of the original run's most popular serials, City of Death (1979). Glover later recorded DVD commentaries for The Crusade episode "The Wheel of Fortune" (from the Lost in Time set) and for City of Death.

In the 1980s, Glover made some of his most notable appearances: the Imperial general Maximilian Veers in The Empire Strikes Back (1980), the ruthless Greek villain Aristotle Kristatos in the James Bond film For Your Eyes Only (1981) and the deceptive American Nazi Walter Donovan in Indiana Jones and the Last Crusade (1989). 

On television, he played the leading role of Sir Martin Lacey in the BBC English Civil War drama series By the Sword Divided, and played the guest role of surgeon Arnold Richardson in a 1989 episode of the BBC medical drama Casualty (he made a second guest appearance as a different character in 2011, and also appeared as a different character again in the sister series Holby City in 2014). He has also played a leading role in the British film Brash Young Turks.

In the 2002 film version of Harry Potter and the Chamber of Secrets, Glover voiced the giant spider Aragog.

Glover has been associated with the epic poem Beowulf since the 1980s and has delivered staged interpretations in various forms, often taking the role of an Anglo-Saxon gleeman or traveller poet, delivering an abridged version of the tale while standing around a mead hall hearth and rendering selected passages in the poem's original Old English. This adaptation has been shown in documentaries on both the English language and Anglo-Saxon England and was also used for historian Michael Wood's documentary on the poem broadcast during the BBC Poetry Season in 2009. He adapted his interpretation in novel form as Beowulf: An Adaptation.

In 2009, Glover played the role of Mr. Brownlow in the West End revival of the musical Oliver! at the Theatre Royal, Drury Lane. In the short film Battle for Britain (2010), Glover played a 101-year-old Polish veteran Royal Air Force pilot.

Glover portrayed the character of Grand Maester Pycelle in the HBO series Game of Thrones between 2011 and 2016, appearing in a total of 31 episodes across the first six seasons of the show.

In 2013, Glover played the role of General Beauvilliers in the BBC Four drama series The Spies of Warsaw. In May 2014, he played the character Joe Goodridge in two episodes of the BBC TV medical drama series Holby City ("My Name is Joe" and "No Apologies"). In the same year, he portrayed an old man in horror thriller Backtrack.

In 2019, Glover played the role of Nonno in the West End theatre production of Tennessee Williams' The Night of the Iguana at the Noël Coward Theatre.

Glover is an associate member of the Royal Academy of Dramatic Art.

Awards 
In 1993, Glover was awarded the Laurence Olivier Award for Best Actor in a Supporting Role for his title role in the Royal Shakespeare Company's 1992 production of Henry IV, Part 1 and Part 2. Theatre critic Michael Billington called his portrayal of the king in that production "superb".

Honours 
Glover was appointed a Commander of the Order of the British Empire in the 2013 Birthday Honours for services to drama.

Personal life 
Glover has been twice married: to actresses Eileen Atkins and Isla Blair (with whom he has a son, actor Jamie Glover).

In 2020, Glover sold 250 lots of photographs, costumes, props and memorabilia from his career at East Bristol Auctions, including his badge of rank from The Empire Strikes Back and the watch, overcoat and personal script from Indiana Jones and the Last Crusade.

Filmography

Film

Television

References

External links 

 
 
 

1935 births
20th-century British Army personnel
20th-century English male actors
21st-century English male actors
Alumni of RADA
Commanders of the Order of the British Empire
English male film actors
English male Shakespearean actors
English male stage actors
English male television actors
Laurence Olivier Award winners
Living people
Male actors from London
National Youth Theatre members
People educated at Alleyn's School
People educated at Bristol Grammar School
People from Hampstead
Royal Shakespeare Company members